African Hockey Federation (AfHF) is the continental governing body of field hockey in Africa. It is affiliated by International Hockey Federation and has 25 member nations. It bi-annually organizes Hockey African Cup for Nations, a men's and women's hockey tournament for African nations. The main objective of the organization is to make the game of hockey popular in Africa and to increase number of participants.

Member associations

 Algeria
 Botswana
 Burkina Faso
 Burundi
 Cameroon
 Egypt
 Eswatini 
  The Gambia
 Ghana
 Kenya
 Libya
 Malawi
 Mauritius
 Morocco
 Namibia
 Nigeria
 Seychelles
 Sierra Leone
 South Africa
 Sudan
 Tanzania
 Togo
 Uganda
 Zambia
 Zimbabwe

Competitions

National teams
Hockey Africa Cup of Nations (Men & Women)
African Games (Men & Women) in cooperation with Association of National Olympic Committees of Africa
African Olympic Qualifier (Men & Women)
Hockey Juniors Africa Cup of Nations (Men & Women)
African Youth Games in cooperation with Association of National Olympic Committees of Africa
Indoor Africa Cup (Men & Women)

Junior
Hockey Juniors Africa Cup of Nations (Men & Women)
Field hockey at the African Youth Games in cooperation with Association of National Olympic Committees of Africa

Clubs
Hockey Africa Cup for Club Champions (Men & Women)

National team rankings

See also
International Hockey Federation

References

External links
Official website

Field hockey organizations
Field hockey in Africa
Sports governing bodies in Africa